The Malhada Vermelha Formation is an Early Cretaceous (Valanginian to Hauterivian) geologic formation in Ceará, northeastern Brazil. The formation preserves reptile, fish and ichnofossils.

Description 
The formation is characterized by a cyclic sequence of siltstones that are intercalated with fine to medium sandstones with the presence of festoon cross-stratification and climbing ripples, deposited in an alluvial environment in a hot semiarid paleoclimate.

The formation crops out in two minibasins, the Lima Campos and eponymous Malhada Vermelha Basins.

Fossil content 
The following fossils were reported from the formation:
 Fish
 cf. Lepitodes sp.
 Hybodontidae indet.
 Reptiles
 Crocodylomorpha indet.
 Ichnofossils
 Taenidium barretti
 Carnosauria indet.

See also 
 Crato Formation
 Romualdo Formation
 Missão Velha Formation

References

Bibliography 
 
 
 

Geologic formations of Brazil
Lower Cretaceous Series of South America
Cretaceous Brazil
Hauterivian Stage
Valanginian Stage
Sandstone formations
Alluvial deposits
Ichnofossiliferous formations
Paleontology in Brazil
Environment of Ceará
Landforms of Ceará
Northeast Region, Brazil